Edoardo Mulargia (10 December 1925 – 7 September 2005) was an Italian director and screenwriter.

Life and career 
Born in Torpè, Nuoro, Mulargia graduated in Law, first working as a journalist, then directing numerous scientific and industrial short films. After being assistant of Pietro Germi and Luciano Emmer, in 1963  he made his feature film debut  with Le due leggi. As a film director Mulargia specialized in the spaghetti western genre, in which he was usually credited as  Tony Moore and Edward G. Muller. In the 1980s he abandoned cinema to work for RAI television.

Selected filmography 

 The Invincible Brothers Maciste (screenwriter, 1964)
 Three Swords for Rome (screenwriter, 1964)
 Night of Violence (screenwriter, 1965)
 Perché uccidi ancora (director and screenwriter, 1965)
 Cjamango (director, 1967) 
 The Reward's Yours... The Man's Mine (director and screenwriter, 1969) 
 Shango (director and screenwriter, 1970)
 W Django! (director, 1971)
 La figliastra (director, 1976)
 Orinoco: Prigioniere del sesso (director, 1979) – American re-edited version: Savage Island (1985, with Linda Blair)
 Escape from Hell (director, 1980)

References

External links 
 

1925 births
2005 deaths
Italian film directors
20th-century Italian screenwriters
Italian male screenwriters
People from the Province of Nuoro
Italian male journalists
20th-century Italian journalists
20th-century Italian male writers